Vladislav Gennadyevich Yakovlev (born 14 February 2002) is a Russian football player. He plays as a striker for Pari NN on loan from CSKA Moscow.

Club career
He joined the academy of PFC CSKA Moscow at the age of 6.

He made his debut in the Russian Premier League for PFC CSKA Moscow on 12 April 2021 in a game against FC Rotor Volgograd. He scored his first RPL goal for CSKA on 21 August 2021 against FC Akhmat Grozny.

On 8 June 2022, Yakovlev signed a new contract with CSKA until 2025.

On 7 January 2023, Yakovlev moved on loan to Pari NN until the end of the 2022–23 season, with an option to buy.

Career statistics

References

External links
 
 

2002 births
Living people
Russian footballers
Russia under-21 international footballers
Association football forwards
PFC CSKA Moscow players
FC Nizhny Novgorod (2015) players
Russian Premier League players